Üçoyuk is a village in the Pervari District of Siirt Province in Turkey. The village had a population of 140 in 2021.

References 

Villages in Pervari District
Kurdish settlements in Siirt Province